Macalla pallidomedia is a species of snout moth in the genus Macalla. It was described by Harrison Gray Dyar Jr. in 1910. It is found in Guyana and Brazil.

References

Moths described in 1910
Epipaschiinae